The Western Apoi tribe live in Ondo State, Nigeria. The tribe (also called Apoi, Ijo-Apoi or Apoi-Ijo) consists of nine settlements: Igbobini, Ojuala, Ikpoke, Inikorogha, Oboro, Shabomi, Igbotu, Kiribo and Gbekebo. The Apoi inhabited higher ground than most of the other Ijaw tribes. They speak the Yoruba language as they no longer speak the Ijaw language. They are bordered to the north by the Ikale and to the west by the Ilaje. The clan also shares border with the Arogbo Ijaw to the south and the Furupagha Ijaw to the east across the Siloko River.

The Apoi people trace their origin to a migration from the Central Niger Delta in present day Bayelsa State and further to an early migration from Ile-Ife. Prior to arriving at their present location, tribal traditions recall a long period of settlement at Ukomu in what is now Furupagha territory.

The Apoi took their name from Apoi (Opoi) the son of Kala-Okun, who accompanied his grandfather Ujo on their way back to Otu-Ife or Ile-Ife. In a group of nine, they got lost in trying to trace the route back without the aid of a navigator. So, they decided to settle within the vicinity of the Nun River (Apoi creek), where the present village of Apoi is situated. Ujo who bore the title Kalasuwe (KALA-SUWE or KALUSUWE i.e., small god,), died here and his grandson inherited the title.

Subsequently, Kalasuwe became a royal title passing through the family lineage of Apoi. The nine lineages formed out of the migrating group founded nine quarters (Idumu), of which only five are remembered, these include, Ogboinbou, Apoi, Okoto-aza or Okoto-aja (the original home of Kalasuwe or Ujo himself and the site of one of his ancestral shrines called Oborowi), Umgbuluama, and Inikorogha. Some descendants of Gbaran migrated from Gbaran settlement within the same area, and with the Apoi founded the villages of Keme-Ebiama, Ajama or Azama, Kassama, and Ogboinbiri, Kolokologbene, and Sampou. Together with Gbaran town, these have collectively become known as Apoi Ibe.

The western Apoi who derived from the Okoto-aja or Okotoaza, Umgbuluama, Apoi and other Idumu’s, migrating with the royal family first settled at Ukomu in the area of Furupagha in the western Niger Delta. They stayed here for a long period of time but had to leave due to the activities of soldiers from the Benin empire (this was the time of the expansion of the Benin empire 1500 AD onwards). Most of the ancestors moved on westwards to found the town of Akpaka. After the reign of Five Kalasuwes (approx. 150-200 years), a gradual process of dispersal set in causing the founding of the towns of Igbobini, Igbotu, Oboro, Ojuala (Oju-Ala), Gbekebo and Kiribo. The royal family moved from Akpaka to found Toru-Abukuba (Apukuba or Opukuba). Later on, Toru-Abukuba became the towns of Oboro and Shabomi.

The Western Apoi call Kalasuo Kalasuwe or Kalashuwe and Oborowi, Oborowe. They no longer speak Ijaw language, but a dialect made up of the fusion of Ijaw and Yoruba. Of late, they have moved on to adopting the general Yoruba which most of them now speak. At a later stage as part of the Yoruba influence, the rulers took on the Oba title, before switching back to the ancient titles of Kalasuwe. As children of Ujo, at Ile-Ife the ancestral traditions name them as one of the sub-tribes that sprung from King Adumu-Ala (alias Oduduwa). The Apoi are pre-14th century.

Many Apois have begun seeing themselves totally as Yorubas; while some believe that the acculturation has been completed and Apois have now become part and parcel of the larger Yoruba race. Yet, some others say they are Yorubas by virtue of the oral tradition of their migration from Ile-Ife.

The Apoi king is called Oba and the title is Kalasuwe and dual seats of the throne are in Shabomi and Oboro. 

Here is the list of Apoi Kings, and the communities they rule over:
 Kalasuwe of Apoi Land - Oba (Prof.) Sunday Adejimola Amuseghan
 Olu of Igbobini - Oba Oyedele Raphael
 Odogun of Igbekebo - Oba Bamidele Dabo
 Gbaluwe of Igbotu - Oba Adeniyi Ajayi
 Alakpaka of Kiribo - Oba J.O. Ajayi
 Takunbe of Ikpoke - Vacant
 Jowe of Inikorogha - Oba M.A. Olasehinde
 Ibini of Ojuala - Vacant
 Okiribiti of Shabomi - Oba Felix Adeyemi Koledoye

References

Ijaw
Ondo State
Yoruba language